Thomas Tomkins (died 16 March 1555) was a 16th-century English Protestant martyr. He was a weaver from Shoreditch, London, and was examined by Bishop Bonner. Despite having been subjected to torture, he insisted that he did not believe in transubstantiation. As a result, he was burned to death at Smithfield on 16 March 1555. His story is recorded in Foxe's Book of Martyrs.

References

People executed under Mary I of England
1555 deaths
Executed British people
People executed for heresy
16th-century Protestant martyrs
Executed people from London
People executed by the Kingdom of England by burning
People from the London Borough of Hackney
Year of birth unknown
Protestant martyrs of England